Spalding Academy School is a private, Roman Catholic high school in Spalding, Nebraska, United States.  It is located in the Roman Catholic Diocese of Grand Island.

Background

Spalding Academy was founded in 1891, and added high school classes by 1905.

Athletics
Spalding Academy is a member of the Nebraska School Activities Association.  Their teams won the Nebraska state eight-man football championship in 1979, and the six-man football championship in 1993.

References

External links
School website

Roman Catholic Diocese of Grand Island
Catholic secondary schools in Nebraska
Schools in Greeley County, Nebraska
Educational institutions established in 1891
1891 establishments in Nebraska